Digby/Annapolis Regional Airport  is located  south of Digby, Nova Scotia, Canada.

References

External links
Digby Airport on COPA's Places to Fly airport directory
Municipality of Digby - Airport Information

Certified airports in Nova Scotia
Transport in Digby County, Nova Scotia
Buildings and structures in Digby County, Nova Scotia